At least two ships of the Royal Navy have borne the name HMS Fiona:

 was an armed boarding steamer in the First World War. She was wrecked in 1917.
 was an armed boarding vessel in the Second World War. She was sunk by air attack in 1941.
 was a  water tractor – akin to a tug – in service during the 1980s

Royal Navy ship names